Susan Thorsgaard (born 13 October 1988) is a former Danish handball player, who played for the Danish women's national handball team.

At the 2010 European Women's Handball Championship she reached the bronze final and placed fourth with the Danish team.

References

1988 births
Living people
Sportspeople from Aarhus
Danish female handball players
Handball players at the 2012 Summer Olympics
Olympic handball players of Denmark